Olof Olsson was born on February 6, 1859, in Jonstorp and died on July 16, 1934. Olof Olsson was a Swedish farmer and politician representing Farmer's League (later renamed the Centre Party). He was the leader of the party.

Biography 
Olof Olsson grew up on a farm close to Jonstorp in Småland. He became the leader of the party in 1929. In 1934, shortly before Olsson's death, he was succeeded by Axel Pehrsson-Bramstorp, with whom he had a strained relationship.

References

20th-century Swedish politicians
Members of the Andra kammaren
Centre Party (Sweden) politicians
1859 births
1934 deaths